Ribblesdale High School is a coeducational secondary school located in Clitheroe in the English county of Lancashire.

It is a Community school administered by Lancashire County Council, and offers GCSEs and BTECs as programmes of study for pupils. Ribblesdale High School was also previously awarded specialist status as a Technology College.

Notable former pupils
Rhiannon Clements, actress
Joe Garner, footballer
Alex Hartley, cricketer
Lucien Laviscount, actor
Reagan Ogle, footballer
Connor Ripley, footballer
Dom Telford, footballer
Scott Wharton, footballer

Notable former staff
Paul Patrick, LGBT rights activist

References

Secondary schools in Lancashire
Community schools in Lancashire
Schools in Clitheroe